The Fish! Philosophy (styled FISH! Philosophy), modeled after the Pike Place Fish Market, is a business technique that is aimed at creating happy individuals in the workplace. John Christensen created this philosophy in 1998 to improve organizational culture. The central four ideas are: "play", "be there", "make their day", and "choose your attitude".

History 

On a visit to Seattle in 1997, John Christensen, owner of ChartHouse Learning, observed fish sellers at Pike Place Fish Market tossing trout and salmon through the air of the market, providing high energy that energized many pedestrians passing by on their lunch breaks. They gave their complete attention to each customer and ensured each had an enjoyable visit.

Christensen noticed the actual work of selling fish was repetitive, cold and exhausting. It occurred to him that the fishmongers might not enjoy every part of their job, but they chose to bring joy to how they approached it. They also sold a lot of fish. He asked the fishmongers if he could film them and they agreed. Lee Copeland Gladwin reports the events at hand spawned a film entitled Fish to be released, June 1998. John Christensen created the Fish Philosophy in 1998. From the film, a book entitled Fish! A Remarkable Way to Boost Morale and Improve Results, by Stephen C. Lundin, Harry Paul, and John Christensen was written. When Christensen and his team examined the footage, they identified four simple practices anyone could apply to their work and life. Karen Boynes, asserts once application of the four concepts of choosing your attitude, play, make someone's day, and be there, start, the environment changes to welcome positivity into the work place. ChartHouse Learning called these concepts The Fish! Philosophy.

Business use
A number of organizations have used The Fish! Philosophy language to guide how they approach work.

Ranken Jordan Pediatric Specialty Hospital in St. Louis has four FISH! banners, one for each practice, hanging in its lobby as a symbol of its commitment to patients, parents and visitors. The staff uses the philosophy as a reminder to thank and recognize each other. Ranken Jordan's patient/parent satisfaction is above 95 percent and its employee retention above 97 percent.

Stephania Davis reports that The P.T. Barnum pediatric unit at Bridgeport Hospital applied the four beliefs to the team to help ease the patients' and families' stay. Each principle assigned to a group of the pediatric team that Ms. Gomez, charge nurse of the unit, divided. The feedback from the parents after the change was very promising. Ms. Gomez has stated, “They [the employees] like coming to work again…”.

The Fish! Philosophy is applied in companies as far away as the Middle East. Wild Wadi Water Park, in Dubai, United Arab Emirates, uses the video and principles in the socialization process of each of its new hires. The employees also continue to live by its principles under the initiative of the current General Manager, who makes sure that his management style both reflects these principles and that his employees are also working in an environment that allows them to simultaneously have fun and be productive. A visible indicator of this is the team video produced for the Wild Wadi's version of the Harlem Shake (song). In 2004, the water-park won the SWIM Award for their Front Line Employee Training Program using "The Fish Philosophy". The Wild Wadi is not the only company in Dubai to actively use the Fish! philosophy, even the American Hospital uses the video in customer service training for its front line staff.

Customers such as Bill Bean are well aware of when the energy in a business is negative. In an article, he wrote for “The Recorder” he talked about how when he usually visits Ontario Ministry of Health the atmosphere is very dark and cold. On his last visit, the team excitedly welcomed him into the office to renew his Ontario Health Card. The sudden change in the attitude of the staff was all thanks to the implementation of the fish philosophy in day-to-day operations of the business.

Tile Tech, a roofing company in Tacoma, WA, focused on being there for each other to increase awareness of safety hazards, decreasing its injury rate by 50%.

Charlotte Tucker believes Industrial Piping Systems has fully embraced the Fish! ideology, as fish replicas hang from the ceilings and attach to walls to prove it. Christine Wardrop, president of IPS, describes the idea by saying, “They’re the rules of Life… You should focus on them and keep them in your mind”.

Rochester Ford Toyota in Rochester, MN, known for tough negotiating, shifted to a fixed price and an emphasis on making the customer's day. New car sales doubled and it recorded a 30% rise in customer satisfaction.

In April 2000, the Ford Motor Company decided to incorporate the Fish Philosophy in their training programs. This decision came about as a result of the lack of motivation in a certain division of the company.

Sprint call center in Lenexa, KS, used Play to make the job more fun. Employees selected music for common areas and the dress code was relaxed. Managers worked to Be There by asking employees for their ideas on improving the business. Four-year productivity rose 20% and first-year employee retention increased 25%.

K-12 education use
Educators may use The Fish! Philosophy to build supportive relationships with students and help students practice personal responsibility. Both are keys in creating effective classrooms.
The Fish! Philosophy is thought to spark creativity in the schoolhouse and the workplace.

Criticism

In his book Organization Theory: A Libertarian Perspective, Kevin Carson calls Fish! "vile" and a "lesson from the powerful to the powerless", adding:

References

External links
 ChartHouse Learning
 Flying Fish Presentation
 Aquarium Fish Videos

Motivation
Office administration
Business fables